Chief Executive elections were held in Macau on 29 August 2004 for the second term of the Chief Executive of Macau (CE), the highest office of the Macau Special Administrative Region. Incumbent Chief Executive Edmund Ho was re-elected unopposed.

Candidates 
Edmund Ho, incumbent Chief Executive of Macau

Results
Ho was elected with nearly 99% of electoral votes.

References

Macau
Chief Executive
Macau
Single-candidate elections
Chief Executive elections in Macau